State Route 231 (SR-231) is the shortest state highway in the U.S. state of Utah. It serves as a connection between U.S. Route 89 (US-89) and SR-31 in Fairview.

Route description
SR-231 begins at the intersection of State Street (US-89) and Milburn Road, proceeding north on the latter. After slightly less than a city block, the route comes to its northern terminus at Canyon Road (SR-31). The road continues to the north towards Milburn, but it is not state-maintained beyond the SR-31 junction.

History
The road from Fairview north to Milburn was added to the state route system in 1912 as part of SR-32, and in 1926 it became part of the original alignment of US-89. US-89 was moved to bypass Milburn in 1937, and the old route between Fairview and Milburn was transferred to SR-91. The routes remained in this configuration until 1969, when SR-91 was removed from the state highway system in a mass deletion of minor state highways and transferred to local jurisdiction.

However, the short segment of former SR-91 between US-89 and SR-31 in Fairview continued to be used as the primary connection from northbound US-89 to eastbound SR-31, and vice versa. As a result, in the meeting of the Utah Transportation Commission on October 12, 2018, this one-block segment was re-added to the state highway system as SR-231.

Major intersections

References

231
 231
State highways in the United States shorter than one mile